Ziony Zevit (born February 13, 1942) is an American scholar of biblical literature and Northwest Semitic languages, and a professor at the American Jewish University.

Biography
Zevit received his B.A. degree from University of Southern CA in 1964, and Ph.D. degree from University of California, Berkeley in 1974. He joined the faculty of American Jewish University in 1974.

Zevit was awarded a Guggenheim Fellowship in 1994.

In an article published in 2001, Scott F. Gilbert and Zevit argue that the Bible might be interpreted that Eve was not made from Adam’s rib, but his baculum; which would explain why humans don't have one. Zevit's article published in Biblical Archaeology Review in 2015  presents the same theory and attracted certain public attention.

Works

Books

Lectures

Articles

Thesis

Literature about Ziony Levit
Greenspahn, Frederick E., and Gary A. Rendsburg, eds. Le-maʿan Ziony: Essays in Honor of Ziony Zevit. Wipf and Stock Publishers, 2017.

References

External links
Biography at American Jewish University

1942 births
American Jewish University faculty
American biblical scholars
University of Southern California alumni
University of California, Berkeley alumni
Living people